Julio Mario Luqui-Lagleyze is an Argentine historian. Born in Buenos Aires in 1959 received a degree in History in 1982. He specializes in Hispano-American Military and Naval History and Military Museology. He is currently studying for his PhD in History at the  Universidad Católica Argentina.

In 2004 he received the Primer Premio “Ejército 2004” Award in the Research Area, granted by the Department of Defense (Spain) for his work: “Por el rey, la Fe y la Patria” (For the King, the Faith and the Homeland) a deep study on the Royalist Army during the South America Independence Wars.

Research and Teaching activities 
He conducted research in archives and museums throughout America and Spain enabling contributions to South American military history and in particular to Hispano-American Uniformology.

Teaching
Professor at the Argentine Navy, serves as adviser to the Division of Historical Research Department Naval Historical Studies since 1989.
Head of the Department of Historical Research of the Department of Historical Studies of the Argentine Air Force from 1983 to 1988
Regent in Charge of the Office of the National School of Museology of Buenos Aires, under the National Commission for Museums and Monuments and Historical Sites from 1992 to 1994.
He was also professor of several departments at the National School of Museology of Buenos Aires from 1983 to 1994 and has formed twelve museologists promotions, many of whom play leading roles at specialized museums in Argentina and abroad.

Museums

He has been an adviser to museums, cataloging and classifying collections, in particular military uniforms collections. He also continuously delivers lectures on military, naval and maritime topics, train museums technical staff and advises on museum exhibitions.

Argentina
Complejo Museográfico Enrique Udaondo 
Museo Histórico Nacional 
Museo Histórico Regional de Jujuy y Archivo Histórico Provincial de Jujuy
Museo Histórico Municipal de Rosario “Dr. Julio Marc”.
Museo de Armas de la Nación 
Museo de la Aviación de Ejército
Museo de la Patagonia
Museo del Pasado Cuyano – Mendoza.

Bolivia
Archivo Histórico de Potosí y Museo de la Casa de Moneda de Potosí.

Chile
Archivo General de la Nación - Santiago
Museo Histórico Nacional  - Santiago
Museo Nacional de Bellas Artes – Santiago

Ecuador
Archivo Nacional del Ecuador, Quito.
Casa de la Cultura Ecuatoriana, Quito.
Museo Gijón Caamaño de la Universidad Católica del Ecuador, Quito.

Spain
Archivo del Palacio Real de Madrid
Archivo del Servicio Histórico Militar, Madrid
Archivo Militar del Alcázar de Segovia
Museo del Ejército de Madrid.
Museo Naval de Madrid.

Mexico
Archivo General de la Nación – México DF
Museo Histórico Nacional del Castillo de Chapultepec – México DF.
Museo Nacional de Antropología y Arqueología –México DF.

Perú
Archivo General de la Nación – Lima.
Archivo Histórico Militar del Perú – Lima
Archivo de la Marina del Perú – Callao
Museo Aeronáutico del Perú
Museo Nacional  de Historia –Lima.
Museo Nacional de Arte – Lima.
Museo Nacional de Antropología - Lima
Museo Histórico Militar del Real Felipe.
Museo Naval del Callao.
Archivo Histórico del Cuzco
Museo Histórico Regional  del Cuzco
Museo de Arte Hispanoamericano del Cuzco.

Uruguay
Archivo General de la Nación – Montevideo
Museo Histórico Nacional – Montevideo.
Museo Romántico de Montevideo

Venezuela
Archivo General de la Nación – Caracas.
Academia Nacional de la Historia - Caracas
Museo Bolivariano – Caracas
Museo Casa Natal de Bolivar – Caracas
Museo de Arte Contemporáneo – Caracas
Museo de Bellas Artes - Galería Nacional  Caracas
Museo Casa de Paez – Valencia
Museo de la Fortaleza de Pampatar - Isla de Margarita.

Television
As historian he participated in several TV documentaries, among them the following ones:

Institutions 
He is member or the following institutions:

Former member of the scientific department of the Foundation for the Preservation Subacuatic Cultural Heritage (ALBENGA) and is co-director of several research projects conducted in various locations in Argentina from 1993 to 2000.
Academic Fellow of the Instituto Nacional Sanmartiniano of Argentina since 1996.
Member of the Military History Group of the Argentine National Academy of History since 1994.
Fellow of the Brown National Institute of Argentina, and former Head Secretary.
Founding member of the Argentine Committee of Military History, an affiliate of the International Commission of Military History based in Bern, Switzerland.
Fellow of the Argentine Army Institute of Military History, since 2010.
Founding and Board member of HISTARMAR FOUNDATION, 2010. 
Founding member, Fellow and Correspondent of the following Institutions, Argentine and American Commissions:
Academia de  Estudios Históricos del Partido de Vicente López, 1986
Instituto Argentino de Historia Militar -  Fundador - 1989.
Instituto de Estudios Históricos  Aeroespaciales del Perú - MC - 1985
Instituto de Estudios Históricos Aeronáuticos de Chile - MC - 1987.
Instituto de Historia Aeronáutica y Espacial del Uruguay. - MC -1987.
Centro de Estudios Históricos Militares del  Perú - MC 1994.
Instituto Sanmartiniano del Perú – MC 1998
Instituto Bonaerense de Numismática y Antigüedades - MN 1996
Sociedad Argentina de Historiadores – MN 1986
Unión de Cóndores de las Américas – Diploma de Honor 1993.

Books and publications 
01 - La Guerra de las Malvinas (I) Ejércitos.
Ediciones Oplos, Cuadernos de Historia Militar, Buenos Aires 1990.
02 - El Ejército Realista en la Guerra de Independencia.
Instituto Nacional Sanmartiniano, Buenos Aires  1995.
Declared of Regional Interest by the Santa Fe Province Department of Education
03 - La Fragata Libertad, Embajadora Argentina en los mares del Mundo
Ed. Manrique Zago, Bs. As. 1995. Coautor.
04 - Los Cuerpos Militares en la Historia Argentina 1550–1950
Instituto Nacional Sanmartiniano, Bs.As. 1995.
Fruit of personal research in Argentine Museums and Archives.
05 - Manuel Belgrano, Los Ideales de la Patria
Ed. Manrique Zago, Buenos Aires 1995. Coautor.
06 - Historia y Campañas del Ejército Realista 1810–1820
Instituto Nacional Sanmartiniano Buenos Aires 1997.
07 - La Logia militar Realista y la Independencia del Perú
Lecture published by the Instituto Nacional Sanmartiniano, 1997
08 - Los Realistas, 1810 1826
Ed. Quirón, Valladolid (España) 1998
09 - José de San Martín Libertador de América
Ed. Manrique Zago, 3ra edición 1998. (coautor)
10 - Los Edecanes del Presidente
Edivern 2000, para la Casa Militar de la Presidencia de la Nación.
11 - Historia del Regimiento de Infantería N° 1 “Patricios”
contribution to the historic uniforms and flags. Edivern 2001.
12 - Por el Rey la Fe y la Patria (1º Premio Ejército 2004)
Publicaciones de Defensa – Madrid 2006.
13 - Las Batallas de San Martín
6 DVD and books, Diario Clarín 2007/2008.
14/ 17 - Grandes Batallas de la Historia (colección 20 títulos)
deputy director for the serie and author of 4 books. Berlín 1945, Trafalgar, Ayacucho, Cartagena de Indias, Editorial Planeta Argentina, published in 2007 and 2008.
18 - La ruta de la Libertad –camino de los Patos, San Juan
Ed. GMLTV, 2010.
19 - Historia de los Uniformes Navales Argentinos, ARA
DEHN, Buenos Aires. 2010.
20 – Revolución en el Plata –protagonistas de Mayo de 1810
Academia Nacional de la Historia – Emecé, Buenos Aires 2010. coautor.
21 - Grandes Biografías de los 200 años
12 books and 12 DVD, Clarín 2010, adviser for históric, illustrations and the collection in general.
22 - Grandes Batallas Argentinas - 12 fasciculos, Diario Clarín, 2012
Co-author with Miguel Angel De Marco

References

External links 
Dialnet collection of documents.

20th-century Argentine historians
Argentine male writers
Writers from Buenos Aires
1959 births
Living people
Male non-fiction writers
21st-century Argentine historians